Aleksandra Žvirblytė is a Lithuanian pianist.

She graduated at the Lithuanian Academy of Music, completing her studies in Russian (1989-1991), German and Swiss Conservatories. She has performed internationally since. She was awarded with, respectively, a 2nd and a 3rd prize in the 1986 (inter-republical) and 1991 (international) editions of the Ciurlionis competition, and in 1999 she won the Paris' Nikolay Rubinstein competition.

Žvirblytė is an associated professor at the Lithuanian Academy of Music and Theatre.

References
Lietuvos Muzikos Atlikėjų Informacijos Centras

Lithuanian classical pianists
Lithuanian women pianists
Living people
Academic staff of the Lithuanian Academy of Music and Theatre
Musicians from Vilnius
21st-century classical pianists
1971 births
Women classical pianists
21st-century women pianists